Kateryna Zelenko  (born 10 August 1980) is a Ukrainian diplomat who served as the spokesperson of the Foreign Ministry of Ukraine between 2018 and 2020. She was appointed as the Ambassador of Ukraine to the Republic of Singapore by President Volodymyr Zelensky on 14 November 2020.

Early life and education 
Zelenko was born in Vinnytsia, Vinnytsia Oblast on 10 August 1980. She graduated from the Taras Shevchenko National University of Kyiv in 2002. She holds a PhD in international relations, and is an English translator.

Professional career and experience 
Since 2002, she is at the diplomatic service of Ukraine. She worked at the Embassy of Ukraine in the Republic of Austria and the Permanent Delegation to international organisations in Vienna, twice as the first secretary of the Embassy of Ukraine in Germany. During the period between foreign travel she occupied various positions in the Department of Personnel, the Department of the European Union and the Political Department of the Ministry of Foreign Affairs of Ukraine.

During recent years Kateryna Zelenko was responsible for interaction with mass media and informative and explanatory work.

References 

1980 births
Living people
People from Vinnytsia
Taras Shevchenko National University of Kyiv alumni
Ukrainian diplomats
Ukrainian women diplomats